WYTE (106.5 FM, Y106.5) is a radio station  broadcasting a country music format. Licensed to Marshfield, Wisconsin, United States, the station serves the Wausau-Stevens Point area.  The station is currently owned by NRG Media, LLC.

History
The station went on the air as WDLB-FM on 1965-08-03.  On 1979-10-22, the station changed its call sign to WLJY, and on 2006-08-01 to the current WYTE.

On-air personalities currently hosting programs on Y106.5 include John Harry, Kimberlee Ann, and Greg Lee.  Previous on-air personalities have included Eric Westphal, Brad Austin, Ed Paulson, Ritch Cassidy, Kelli Martin, Mark Skibba, Ken Steckbauer, Lou Stewart, John Jost, and many others.

In 2012 WYTE discontinued their long running "Polkafest" Sunday morning programming.  From 6am-10am the station played nothing but polka music from various genres including old time, Slovak, German, Polish and several others.

25th birthday
In November 2010, Y106.5 celebrated its 25th Birthday in Central Wisconsin.  National recording artist Jerrod Niemann performed as part of the ceremonies which included the giving away of a 1985 Chevy pick-up truck to a lucky listener.  WYTE first signed on as a country station in the fall of 1985 on the old 96.7 frequency.  WLJY and WYTE flipped frequencies in August 2006 with WLJY then residing at 96.7. In late 2011, WLJY became WHTQ / "Hot 96-7".

References

External links

YTE
NRG Media radio stations